Jenson Van Emburgh (born 28 May 2000) is an American para table tennis player who competes at international elite competitions. He is a Paralympic bronze medalist, Parapan American Games silver medalist and a double Pan-American silver medalist. He is the son of former tennis player and 1990 Wimbledon Championships semifinalist Greg Van Emburgh. Jenson was paralysed from the chest down following a spinal cord injury after birth.

References

2000 births
Living people
Sportspeople from Pinellas County, Florida
Paralympic table tennis players of the United States
Medalists at the 2019 Parapan American Games
People with paraplegia
Medalists at the 2020 Summer Paralympics
Table tennis players at the 2020 Summer Paralympics
People from Belleair, Florida
Sportspeople from Naples, Florida
American male table tennis players